Václav is a Czech male first name of Slavic origin, sometimes translated into English as Wenceslaus or Wenceslas. These forms are derived from the old Slavic/Czech form of this name: Venceslav.

Nicknames are: Vašek, Vašík, Venca, Venda

For etymology and cognates in other languages, see Wenceslaus.

Václav or Vácslav 
 Saint Wenceslaus I, Duke of Bohemia (907–935 or 929) (svatý Václav)
 Václav Noid Bárta, singer, songwriter, and actor
Václav Binovec, Czech film director and screenwriter
 Václav Brožík, painter
 Václav Hanka, philologist
 Václav Havel, last President of Czechoslovakia (1989 – 1992) and first President of the Czech Republic (1993 – 2003)
 Václav Holek, Designer of the ZB-26 light machinegun for Zbrojovka Brno and its descendants 
 Václav Hollar, graphic artist
 Vaclav Jelinek, a Czechoslovak spy, who worked in London under the assumed identity of Erwin van Haarlem
 Václav Jiráček, Czech actor
 Václav Jírů, Czech photographer and writer
 Václav Kadlec, a Football player of Czech Republic who involved in Sparta Prague
 Václav Klaus, second President of the Czech Republic (2003 – 2013)
 Václav Kliment Klicpera, playwright, author and poet
 Václav Matěj Kramerius, publisher, journalist and writer
 Josef Václav Myslbek, sculptor
 Václav Nelhýbel, composer
 Václav Neumann, conductor, violinist and viola player
 Vaslav Nijinsky, Russian ballet dancer
 Wacław Potocki, Polish nobleman, poet and writer
 Václav Prospal, NHL hockey player
 Václav Smil, scientist and policy analyst
 Václav Talich, conductor and violinist
 Václav Trojan, Czech composer and arranger
 Václav Varaďa, former NHL hockey player

Veceslav 
 Većeslav Holjevac, Croatian soldier and Communist politician

Other
 8740 Václav, an asteroid named after Wenceslas I, Duke of Bohemia, and other Bohemian rulers of this name
 Václav (film), a 2007 film

See also
 Boleslaus
 Boleslav (given name), includes Boleslaw
 Wenceslaus

Czech masculine given names
Slovak masculine given names
Slavic masculine given names